The Pine Mountain-Cloverdale Peak AVA is an American Viticultural Area in Sonoma County. It is located at the top of Pine Mountain, at the Northern end of the Mayacamas Range, which separates the Napa and Sonoma growing regions. The AVA, which rises between 1600 feet at its  lowest point to 2600 feet at its highest, is one of the highest grape growing regions in California.

Soils and climate 

The Pine Mountain-Cloverdale Peak Appellation has rocky volcanic soils of steep hillsides and ancient alluvial fans. Soils are shallow to moderately deep fractured shale and sandstone, very well drained through gravels. In general, soils are less than 3 feet deep, with over 50% at 12 inches or less. 
On average, there is a twelve degree drop in temperature between the valley floor and the center of the Pine Mountain-Cloverdale Peak AVA. Despite the cooler days, growers on the mountain paradoxically experience relatively warmer night time temperatures, the result of cooler air dropping into the valley, displacing warm air upwards. At 1600 feet, the valley also sits well above the fog that collects in the mornings and evenings down in the valley, giving it three to four more hours of sunlight a day. This unique microclimate creates an altered growing season for Pine Mountain growers, with bud break occurring two to three weeks after vineyards on the valley floor.

Growers 

 Benziger Family Wineries
 Black Oak Basin Vineyards 
 DeMattei 
 Oak Ridge Ranch and Vineyards
 Pine Mountain Vineyards
 Reichel Vineyards
 Seghesio Family
 Silverwood Ranch
 Sky Pine Vineyards
 Tin Cross Vineyards 
 T&P Vineyards
 Wild Creek Ranch

History of Pine Mountain 

The first land ordinances for Pine Mountain were granted to Black Hawk War veterans by Thomas Jefferson, as part of the Land Ordinance act of 1836. In 1855, the same year the French government unveiled its Grand Cru classification for wines, George Allen was planting vineyards within the area of the Pine Mountain-Cloverdale Peak AVA, making it among the first mountaintop plantings in California.
The mountain is home to a number of natural springs, which were bottled and sold as a mineral water for over 50 years. Pine Mountain Spring water ceased production in the 1950s.

References

External links

American Viticultural Areas
American Viticultural Areas of California
American Viticultural Areas of the San Francisco Bay Area
Geography of Sonoma County, California
Sonoma County, California articles missing geocoordinate data
2012 establishments in California